Rudenka  (Rudenka) is a village in the administrative district of Gmina Olszanica, within Lesko County, Subcarpathian Voivodeship, in south-eastern Poland.

References

Villages in Lesko County